Colin Crabbe Racing, also known as Colin Crabbe - Antique Automobiles and Antique Automobiles Racing Team, was a privateer team run by Colin Crabbe, a noted dealer in historic racing cars, that entered a single car in 17 Formula One races in 1969 and 1970. Vic Elford and Ronnie Peterson drove for the team, the cars used being a Cooper T86, a McLaren M7B and a March 701.

Background 
Colin Crabbe is a well-known collector and dealer of historic racing cars, one of his most famous acquisitions being the pre-war Mercedes-Benz W125 now owned by Bernie Ecclestone that had been hidden behind the Iron Curtain for several years. In 1966 and 1967 he entered several sportscar races as a driver, first in an Aston Martin DB4 GT at Silverstone, then in a Ford GT40 in various races in Europe and southern Africa, his most notable result being an eighth place in the 1967 1000 km of Nürburgring with Roy Pierpoint as co-driver.

1969 season 
At the 1969 Race of Champions "Antique Automobiles" made what appears to be the first F1 entry for Colin Crabbe's team, with Roy Pike non-starting due to a fuel pump failure in a Climax-engined Brabham BT23B. A 1967 Cooper T86 Maserati was then entered at the International Trophy, Madrid Grand Prix and Monaco Grand Prix, Neil Corner driving in Spain and Vic Elford driving in the other two. Elford's Monaco entry was somewhat historic, marking the last F1 race for both Cooper as a constructor and Maserati as an engine supplier.

The McLaren M7B, an experimental version of the car with unique low-slung pannier fuel tanks, was then obtained along with a Cosworth DFV engine to replace the rather slow Cooper, which was sold to Swiss car collector Walter Grell. Elford drove the McLaren in a further four Grand Prix that year, finishing tenth at Zandvoort and finishing the next two races in the points with fifth at Clermont Ferrand and sixth at Silverstone. The German Grand Prix was the team's last F1 race that year, as Elford crashed out and wrote off the chassis.

1970 season 
Having retained the DFV engine from the wrecked McLaren, Crabbe was approached by Max Mosley, one of the founders of new-for-1970 F1 constructor March, who offered to supply a March 701 chassis if Crabbe agreed to enter Ronnie Peterson, at that time a promising up-and-coming driver who had won the 1968 Swedish F3 championship and the 1969 Monaco F3 race. Crabbe accepted and Peterson drove in nine Grand Prix races for the team that season, which entered as "Antique Automobile Racing Team" in the first two races and "Colin Crabbe Racing" thereafter.

Chassis 701/8 first became available for the third race of 1970, but with the responsibility of looking after the team's one and only engine, as well as his shortcomings in setting up what turned out to be a difficult car, Peterson was unable to match the pace of the leading 701s driven by Stewart and Amon, although he did compare favourably with experienced works driver Jo Siffert. On his Formula One debut the Swede qualified twelfth and was the only March to finish, just out of the points in seventh.

That was to be Peterson's best result of the year, the remaining races yielding only two ninth places, two unclassified finishes and an eleventh-placed finish in the team's last race at the 1970 United States Grand Prix.

After 1970 
For 1971 Crabbe turned down an offer to run a privateer Ferrari 312, and opted not to continue racing. Crabbe said of his time in Formula One "I like to think I was the last of the serious privateers in F1, excluding Alexander Hesketh who was in a class apart, and Rob Walker, who had retired by then...  I was under some serious pressure from family trustees to pack it in so decided to call it a day... Anyway two years of the most enormous fun and a great deal of experience learnt."

Complete Formula One results
(key)(Races in italics indicate non-championship events)

References 

Formula One entrants
British auto racing teams
Auto racing teams established in 1969
Auto racing teams disestablished in 1970